Lake View is a census-designated place (CDP) in Val Verde County, Texas, United States. Its population was 199 at the 2010 census.

Geography
Lake View is located at  (29.456701, -100.946117).

According to the United States Census Bureau, the CDP has a total area of 0.5 sq mi (1.3 km2), all of it land.

Demographics

2020 census

As of the 2020 United States census, there were 197 people, 39 households, and 39 families residing in the CDP.

2000 census
As of the census of 2000,  167 people, 79 households, and 48 families were residing in the CDP. The population density was 331.0 people /sq mi (129.0/km2). The 123 housing units averaged 243.8/sq mi (95.0/km2). The racial makeup of the CDP was 92.22% White, 1.20% African American, 1.20% Native American, 1.20% Asian, 4.19% from other races. Hispanics of any race were 19.16% of the population.

Of the 79 households, 19.0% had children under 18 living with them, 53.2% were married couples, 2.5% had a female householder with no husband present, and 39.2% were not families. About 34.2% of all households were made up of individuals, and 13.9% had someone living alone who was 65 or older. The average household size was 2.11, and the average family size was 2.71.

In the CDP, the age distribution was 18.0% under 18, 4.2% from 18 to 24, 22.2% from 25 to 44, 29.3% from 45 to 64, and 26.3% who were 65 or older. The median age was 47 years. For every 100 females, there were 98.8 males. For every 100 females age 18 and over, there were 98.6 males.

The median income for a household in the CDP was $33,875, and for a family was $38,333. Males had a median income of $14,479 versus $25,625 for females. The per capita income for the CDP was $19,469. None of the families and 21.9% of the population were living below the poverty line, including none under 18 and 18.5% over 64.

Education
Lake View is served by the San Felipe Del Rio Consolidated Independent School District.

The whole county is served by Southwest Texas Junior College according to the Texas Education Code.

References

Census-designated places in Texas
Census-designated places in Val Verde County, Texas